Music for All Occasions is the fourth studio album by American country music band The Mavericks. The album was released on September 26, 1995, by MCA Nashville. It includes the singles "Here Comes the Rain", "All You Ever Do Is Bring Me Down" and "Missing You". "Somethin' Stupid" is a cover of the Frank Sinatra song.

The song "Foolish Heart" was used on the soundtrack of the 1995 film From Dusk till Dawn.

Critical reception

Rating it 4 out of 5 stars, AllMusic reviewer Mark Deming wrote that "the '50s pop accents that were bubbling under the surface on their previous set began to rise to the surface, both in their music and in the wink-and-nudge camp of the album's artwork" and "the polished cool of its surfaces aren't as immediately inviting" as the band's previous album "but the record's abundant pleasures become clear upon repeated listenings, and its one of the group's best and most accomplished studio sets."

Track listing

Chart performance

References

1995 albums
The Mavericks albums
MCA Records albums
Albums produced by Don Cook